The Chali language (Dzongkha: ཚ་ལི་ཁ་; Wylie: Tsha-li-kha; also called "Chalikha," "Chalipkha," "Tshali," and "Tshalingpa") is an East Bodish language spoken by about 1,398 people in Wangmakhar, Gorsum and Tormazhong villages in Mongar District in eastern Bhutan, mainly around Chhali Gewog on east bank of Kuri Chhu River. Chalikha is related to Bumthangkha and Kurtöpkha.

See also
Languages of Bhutan

References

External links 
Himalayan Languages Project

Languages of Bhutan
East Bodish languages